

American football
 Wildcat formation

Other uses
 Wildcat strike action, a strike action of workers that is not authorized by union leadership
 Wildcatter, a person who drills for oil in areas not yet known to have oil fields
 Wildcat banking, the unusual practices of banks chartered under state law from 1816 to 1863 in the United States